Queens Road is a tram stop in the suburban area of Cheetham Hill, Greater Manchester, England. It is on the Bury Line of Greater Manchester's light rail Metrolink system.

History
It originally opened as a staff halt stop only, serving the Metrolink system's original Queens Road depot at Metrolink House. The station opened on 16 December 2013. Queens Road is the closest station to the Manchester Museum of Transport on Boyle Street and is adjacent to the Irish World Heritage Centre.

The station replaced Woodlands Road tram stop, which closed on the opening day of Queens Road tram stop to passengers.

Services
Services mostly run every 12 minutes on 2 routes, forming a 6-minute service between Bury and Manchester at peak times.

Gallery

References

External links

Metrolink stop information
Queens Road area map

Tram stops in Manchester
Railway stations in Great Britain opened in 2013
Tram stops on the Altrincham to Bury line
Tram stops on the Bury to Ashton-under-Lyne line